The Nobel Conference is an academic conference held annually at Gustavus Adolphus College in St. Peter, Minnesota. Founded in 1963, the conference links a general audience with the world's foremost scholars and researchers in conversations centered on contemporary issues related to the natural and social sciences. It is the first ongoing academic conference in the United States to have the official authorization of the Nobel Foundation in Stockholm, Sweden.

History

Gustavus Adolphus College was founded by Swedish immigrants in 1862 and throughout its history, has continued to honor its Swedish heritage. As the College prepared to build a new science hall in the early 1960s, College officials asked the Nobel Foundation for permission to name the building the Alfred Nobel Hall of Science as a memorial to the great Swedish inventor and philanthropist. Permission was granted, and the facility's dedication ceremony in 1963 included 26 Nobel laureates and officials from the Nobel Foundation.

Following the 1963 Nobel Prize ceremonies in Stockholm, College representatives met with Nobel Foundation officials, asking them to endorse an annual science conference at the College and to allow use of the Nobel name to establish credibility and high standards.  At the urging of several prominent Nobel laureates, the foundation granted the request and the first conference was held at the College in January 1965.

Beginning with the help of an advisory committee composed of Nobel laureates such as Glenn Seaborg, Philip Showalter Hench, and Sir John Eccles, the conferences have been consistently successful in attracting the world's foremost authorities as speakers.

Past speakers have included David H. Hubel, Fritz Lipmann, Sir Harold Walter Kroto, and Mitchell Jay Feigenbaum.

Fifty-nine Nobel laureates have served as speakers, five of whom were awarded the Nobel prize after speaking at the Nobel conference at Gustavus.

The Nobel conference has a focus on scientific topics such as "Medicine: Prescription for Tomorrow" (2006), "The Legacy of Einstein" (2005), "The Science of Aging" (2004), "The Nature of Nurture" (2002), "Virus: The Human Connection" (1998), and "The New Shape of Matter: Materials Challenge Science" (1995). The social sciences are also well represented and many topics are interdisciplinary; focusing on economics, politics, the social sciences, and philosophy.

The Nobel conference is open to the general public.

Current
2022 - Mental Health (In)Equity and Young People

Nobel Conference 58 is happening September 28 & 29, 2022 and will address mental health disparities and their effects on youth, with a particular emphasis on the significance of identity, trauma and technology.

Confirmed 2022 Speakers
 Meryl Alper, Associate Professor of Communication Studies, Northeastern University
 Manuela Barreto, Professor of Social and Organizational Psychology, University of Exeter
 Daniel Eisenberg, Professor, Department of Health Policy and Management, UCLA
 Joseph P. Gone, Professor of Anthropology and of Global Health and Social Medicine, Harvard
 Priscilla Lui, Assistant Professor of Psychology, Southern Methodist University
 G. Nic Rider, Assistant Professor and Coordinator of the Transgender Health Program, Institute for Sexual and Gender Health, and Associate Director for Research, National Center for Gender Spectrum Health, University of Minnesota Medical School
 Brendesha Tynes, Associate Professor of Education and Psychology, USC

2021 Big Data REvolution

The 2021 Nobel Conference was "Big Data REvolution" and took place October 5–6, 2021 in Saint Peter, Minnesota at Gustavus Adolphus College.

How is big data changing our lives, and what challenges and opportunities does this transformation present? In less than a generation, we’ve witnessed nearly every piece of personal, scientific, and societal data come to be stored digitally. Stored information is both an intellectual and an economic commodity; it is used by businesses, governments, academics, and entrepreneurs. The velocity with which it accumulates and the techniques for leveraging it grow at a pace that is remarkable and often intimidating. But this revolution also promises hope, in areas as diverse as public health, drug development, child welfare, and climate change.

Lecturers included:
 Talithia Williams, PhD: Professor of Mathematics, Harvey Mudd College
 Francesca Dominici, PhD Clarence James Gamble Professor of Biostatistics, Population and Data Science; Co-Director, the Data Science Initiative, Harvard University
 Michael Osterholm, PhD A Regents Professor and McKnight Presidential Endowed Chair in Public Health; Director, Center for Infectious Disease Research and Policy at the University of Minnesota
 Cynthia Rudin, PhD Professor of Computer Science, Electrical and Computer Engineering, and Statistical Science; Director, Prediction Analysis Lab, Duke University
 Pilar Ossorio, JD, PhD Professor of Law and Bioethics, University of Wisconsin
 Rhema Vaithianathan, PhD Professor of Health Economics; Director, Centre for Social Data Analytics, Auckland University of Technology
 Wendy Chun, PhD Canada 150 Research Chair; Leader, the Digital Democracies Institute, Simon Fraser University

2020- Cancer in the Age of Biotechnology
Lecturers included:
 Carl June
 Chanita Hughes-Halbert
 Jim Thomas
 Kathryn Schmitz
 Suzanne Chambers
 Charles Sawyers
 Bissan Al-Lazikani

2019- Climate Changed: Facing Our Future

Lectures Included:
 Amitav Ghosh (Not Archived by request)
 Richard Alley
 Diana Liverman
 Sheila Watt-Cloutier
 Gabriele Hegerl
 David Keith
 Mike Hulme

2018- Living Soil: "A Universe Underfoot"

Lectures Included
 David Montgomery
 Claire Chenu
 Rattan Lal
 Frank Uekotter
 Ray Archuleta
 Jack Gilbert
 Suzanne Simard

The 2017 Nobel Conference is titled "Reproductive Technology: How Far Do We Go?" and took place October 3–4, 2017 in Saint Peter, Minnesota at Gustavus Adolphus College.

Lecturers include:
 Jad Abumrad, founder and co-host of Radiolab.
 Alison Murdoch, Professor of Reproductive Medicine at Newcastle University, past member of the Nuffield Council on Bioethics; one of the first people in the world to have been granted approval to clone human embryos for the purpose of research.
 Ruha Benjamin, Sociologist and Assistant Professor in the Department of African American Studies at Princeton University.
 Diana Blithe, program director for the Male Contraceptive Development Program at the National Institutes of Health.
 Charis Thompson, Professor of Sociology, London School of Economics and Political Science.

2016 - In Search of Economic Balance 

Lecturers included:
 Dan Ariely, Ph.D, Behavioral Economist and chief behavioral economist for Qapital.
 Paul Collier, Ph.D, British Economist, director of the International Growth Centre, and former director of the Development Research Group of the World Bank
 Deirdre McCloskey, Ph.D, Economic Historian
 Orley Ashenfelter, Ph.D, Economist, former director of the Office of Evaluation of the U.S. Department of Labor and professor of economics at Princeton University
 Joerg Rieger, Ph.D, Theologian
 John A. List, Ph.D, Economist, Distinguished Service Professor in Economics and the Chairman of the Department of Economics at the University of Chicago.
 Chris Farrell, Economic Journalist and economics editor for Marketplace Money on American Public Media.

2015 - Addiction: Exploring the Science and Experience of an Equal Opportunity Condition

Lecturers included:
 Owen Flanagan, Ph.D, James B. Duke Professor and Faculty Fellow in Cognitive Neuroscience at Duke University
 Eric R. Kandel, MD, Neuropsychiatrist and 2000 Nobel laureate in physiology and medicine
 Carl Hart, Ph.D, Neuroscientist
 Denise Kandel, Ph.D, Medical sociologist
 Marc David Lewis, Ph.D, Developmental neuroscientist
 John A. List, Ph.D, Economist
 Sheigla B. Murphy, Ph.D, Director of the Center for Substance Abuse Studies at the Institute for Scientific Analysis

2014 - Where does Science Go from Here?

Lecturers included:
 Steven Weinberg, Ph.D, Theoretical physicist and 1979 Nobel laureate in physics
 Sir Harold W. Kroto, Ph.D, 1996 Nobel laureate in chemistry
 Steven Chu, Ph.D, 12th United States Secretary of Energy and 1997 Nobel laureate in physics
 Antonio Damasio, MD, PhD, Neuroscientist and head of the Brain and Creativity Institute 
 Harry B. Gray, PhD, Electron transfer (ET) chemist
 Freeman Dyson, FRS, Theoretical physicist and mathematician
 Patricia Smith Churchland, Neurophilosopher

2013 - The Universe at its Limits

Lecturers included:
 Frank A. Wilczek, Ph.D, American theoretical physicist, Mathematician, 2004 Nobel laureate in physics, discovered time crystal in 2012.
 Samuel C.C. Ting, Ph.D, American theoretical physicist and 1976 Nobel laureate in physics for discovering the subatomic J/ψ particle.
 George F. Smoot III, Ph.D, 2006 Nobel laureate in physics
 Alexei V. Filippenko, Ph.D,  American astrophysicist on supernovae and active galaxies at optical, ultraviolet, and near-infrared wavelengths.
 S. James Gates Jr., Ph.D,  theoretical physicist known for work on supersymmetry, supergravity, and superstring theory.
 Lawrence M. Krauss, Ph.D, American-Canadian theoretical physicist and cosmologist
 Tara G. Shears, Ph.D, Physicist

Other past Nobel Conferences include:
 2012 - Our Global Ocean
 2011 - The Brain and Being Human
 2010 - Making Food Good

2000s
 2009 - H2O Uncertain Resource
 2008 - Who Were the First Humans?
 2007 - Heating Up: The Energy Debate
 2006 - Medicine: Prescription for Tomorrow
 2005 - The Legacy of Einstein
 2004 - The Science of Aging
 2003 - The Story of Life
 2002 - The Nature of Nurture
 2001 - What is still to be discovered?
2000 - Globalization 2000: Economic Prospects and Challenges

Lecturers included:
 Robert A. Mundell, Ph.D, Economist and 1999 Alfred Nobel Memorial Prize in Economic Sciences
 Joseph Stiglitz, Ph.D, former Chief Economist of the World Bank and recipient of the Nobel Memorial Prize in Economic Sciences in 2001
 Jeffrey D. Sachs, PH.D, Economist, since 2017 serves as special adviser to the United Nations Secretary-General António Guterres.
 Jagdish Natwarlal Bhagwati, PH.D, Economist 
 Amitai Etzioni, PH.D, former senior adviser to the White House.

1990s
 1999 - Genetics in the New Millennium
 1998 - Virus: The Human Connection
 1997 - Unveiling the Solar System: 30 Years of Exploration
 1996 - Apes at the End of an Age: Primate Language and Behavior in the '90s
 1995 - The New Shape of Matter: Materials Challenge Science
 1994 - Unlocking the Brain: Progress in Neuroscience
 1993 - Nature Out of Balance: The New Ecology
 1992 - Immunity: The Battle Within
 1991 - The Evolving Cosmos
 1990 - Chaos: The New Science

1980s
 1989 - The End of Science?
 1988 - The Restless Earth
 1987 - Evolution of Sex
 1986 - The Legacy of Keynes
 1985 - The Impact of Science on Society
 1984 - How We Know: The Inner Frontiers of Cognitive Science
 1983 - Manipulating Life
 1982 - Darwin's Legacy
 1981 - The Place of Mind in Nature
 1980 - The Aesthetic Dimension of Science

1970s
 1979 - The Future of the Market Economy
 1978 - Global Resources: Perspectives and Alternatives
 1977 - The Nature of Life
 1976 - The Nature of the Physical Universe
 1975 - The Future of Science
 1974 - The Quest for Peace
 1973 - The Destiny of Women
 1972 - The End of Life
 1971 - Shaping the Future
 1970 - Creativity

1960s
 1969 - Communication
 1968 - The Uniqueness of Man
 1967 - The Human Mind
 1966 - The Control of the Environment
 1965 - Genetics and the Future of Man

External links
 Nobel Conference official website
 Archival finding aid for the collection Nobel Conference.  Nobel Conference Collection, 1965-Ongoing. GACA Collection 92.  Gustavus Adolphus College Archives, St. Peter, Minnesota.

Academic conferences